John Arthur Smith (born 1942) is an American politician who served as a member of the New Mexico Senate, representing the 35th District from 1989 to 2021. 
In 2002, he sought to represent New Mexico's second congressional district when veteran congressman Joe Skeen announced that he was retiring. He defeated Las Cruces mayor Ruben Smith in the Democratic primary, but ultimately lost to Republican Steve Pearce 56 to 44 percent.

Career 
Smith chaired the Senate Finance Committee. He has been nicknamed "Dr. No" for fiscal conservatism, breaking with his party to refuse funding for many spending programs. Critics have called Smith "the primary obstacle to more substantial investment in early childhood education" for his refusal to allow a vote on whether to withdraw 1% more each year from the state's $18 billion Land Grant Permanent Fund to fund early childhood programs.

Smith faced opposition in the 2020 Democratic primary from Neomi Martinez-Parra, a special education teacher and former New Mexico Democratic Party vice chair. In the July 2, 2020 primary, Smith lost to Martinez-Parra.

References

External links
 Senator John Arthur Smith at the NM Senate website
 Project Vote Smart - Senator John Arthur Smith (NM) profile
 Follow the Money - John Arthur Smith
 2008 2006 2004 2000 1992 campaign contributions
 http://www.nmlegis.gov/lcs/legislator_details.aspx?SPONCODE=SSMIT

Democratic Party New Mexico state senators
1942 births
Living people
People from Deming, New Mexico
21st-century American politicians